Kaseb Mahalleh (also Romanized as Kāseb Maḩalleh) is a village in northern Iran. It is located in Pain Khiyaban-e Litkuh Rural District, in the Central District of Amol County, Mazandaran Province. At the 2006 census, its population was 294, in 68 families.

References 

Populated places in Amol County